José María Arroyo y Pidal (1875 – March 8, 1927) was a Filipino politician. He served as the representative of the first district of Iloilo from 1916 to 1919, and as a senator representing the seventh senatorial district from 1919 until his death in 1927.

Arroyo died in Italy on March 8, 1927. He is the grandfather of former first gentleman, Jose Miguel Arroyo who is the husband of former president Gloria Macapagal Arroyo. The Arroyo Fountain in front of the Iloilo Provincial Capitol and built in 1927 was named after him in recognition for his efforts of authoring Republic Act No. 3222, a law that establishes the Iloilo Metropolitan Waterworks in 1925. It stands on Kilometer Zero as the benchmark to measure distances from Iloilo City to other points in Panay Island, Western Visayas region and other places in the Philippines.

References

1875 births
1927 deaths
Senators of the 5th Philippine Legislature
Senators of the 6th Philippine Legislature
Members of the House of Representatives of the Philippines from Iloilo
Nacionalista Party politicians
People from Iloilo City
Filipino people of Spanish descent
Senators of the 7th Philippine Legislature
Visayan people